Argjend or Argjent is a Kosovar-Albanian masculine given name that may refer to
Argjend Beqiri (born 1974), Macedonian footballer and manager of Albanian ethnicity
Argjent Halili (born 1982), Albanian football goalkeeper 
Argjend Malaj (born 1994), Kosovar-Albanian football midfielder 
Argjend Mustafa (born 1992), Kosovar-Albanian football midfielder
Argjend Mustafa (footballer, born 1993), Kosovar-Albanian football player

Albanian masculine given names